Killester is a small residential suburb of Dublin, Ireland on the Northside of the city in the Dublin 3 and Dublin 5 postal districts. It was the site of a church and convent or monastery centuries ago, and later a small village developed. In 1922, a settlement for ex-servicemen and their families was established, and the area grew with suburban housing later. The local parish church has for many years hosted a relic of St Brigid.

Killester is also a civil parish in the ancient barony of Coolock.

Location and access
Killester is located between Clontarf, Donnycarney, Raheny and Artane, on the Northside of Dublin. It is one of the smaller suburbs, with the entire civil parish just 228 acres in size. The village centre is on the Howth Road, about 5 kilometres from Dublin city centre, and the bulk of the area lies between the Howth and Malahide Roads, and Brookwood Avenue. 

Killester has a rail station on the DART line (also on the Dublin-Belfast line but with no stopping of inter-city trains), and Dublin Bus routes H1, H2, H3, and 42A connect the district to the city centre and other suburbs to the east and north. The original Killester railway station opened on 1 October 1845 but closed after two years, re-opening on a new site about  further north in 1923.

History

Killester has been noted in city and church records going back many centuries, with variant spellings such as "Killtrsta" (St. Laurence O'Toole), "Quillestra" and "Kylestre", and was the site of both an early church and a convent or monastery. The name probably means "Church of (St) Stra". The ruins of a religious building can still be seen, and nearby there is a modern convent, with a school.

The manor of Killester was given to one Adrian le Brun in the twelfth century. In the seventeenth century, it was owned by the White family, from whom it passed by inheritance to the St Lawrence family, Barons and later Earls of Howth. In the seventeenth century, it went to the Cootes, a branch of the family of the Earls of Mountrath. By the 1830s the population was around 110, and there were several large houses, the principal being Killester House, others being Maryville, Woodville, Hollybrook House, Hollybrook Park and Killester Lodge.

The Irish Sailors and Soldiers Land Trust and Killester
Killester, a primarily residential area, is perhaps best known for its association with World War I veterans who were settled there in planned development from late 1922 onwards, organised by the Irish Sailors' and Soldiers' Land Trust. The Trust, the group that catered for the housing needs of ex-servicemen at the time, were responsible for the construction of 2,700 homes in Ireland from 1919 to 1934, to house the British and Irish men who fought in World War I. The Killester scheme was one of many started in answer to the 20th century housing crisis and worsening housing conditions of the working classes at the time. The 1914 "Housing Enquiry" found that 14,000 homes were needed to cater for the working classes at a cost of 3.5 million pounds.

Construction
The Killester ISSLT Scheme began construction in 1922 after it was found in the "1914 Housing Enquiry" that there was a need for better housing for the men who fought in the war. However, foundations for the scheme had already been established in advance of 1921, as the Irish government at the time had inserted drains. The Killester ISSLT Scheme (known alternatively  as “Sensu Strictu”) was the largest housing project for ex-British servicemen at the time of its construction. The scheme had been approved under British Prime Minister David Lloyd-George's "Homes For Heroes" social housing scheme. The "Homes for Heroes" scheme was fuelled by a pre-existing housing crisis after World War I. The idea of better housing for men who had fought in the war was part of the British Government's recruitment campaign. However, the British government had not expected that Ireland would be an independent nation after the Easter Rising in April 1916. After Ireland had declared independence from Britain, the Free State refused to fund the Trust itself. Despite the new status of the Irish Free State, high tensions and the strained relationship between the British government and the Dáil, both parties came to an agreement and the British government were granted permission to build homes for ex-servicemen under the imperial ISSLT group.  Additionally, a debated specification from the Department of Labour in 1921 urged that no English materials were to be used in the construction of new houses of any schemes from the ISSLT. 

The Killester scheme began with plans for 247 dwellings, eventually consisted of 289 houses.  It was laid out in areas named Abbeyfield, Middle Third and The Demesne. The homes were unusual in comparison to other Dublin houses from the scheme. They were self-contained units and architecturally different in design compared to other houses of the ISSLT group in Drumcondra that had previously been blended into various neighbourhoods. The Killester ISSLT scheme was considered to be in a "rural" location, and based in an area which was at the time underdeveloped but not isolated, as it was in close proximity to a number of suburban areas. The houses were based on Ebenezer Howard's "Garden City" concept. In 1928, smaller two-storey houses were added to the scheme, in Abbeyfield and Middle Third, increasing the number of dwellings to the 289 that it is known for today. A social hierarchy was maintained within the scheme, as between officers and regular soldiers - officers were housed in the larger houses of The Demesne while the others were situated in the smaller additional dwellings in Abbeyfield. 

The scheme consisted of low housing densities and featured large gardens with plenty of open space with the main aim of giving ex-service men a chance at a better life. The houses were smaller in size compared to other ISSLT developments despite the Trust originally requesting larger dwellings in a higher-density format. Laid out as suburban garden bungalows, each dwelling ranged between 1007 square feet to 675 square feet, each house had a parlour, sitting room, scullery, 3 bedrooms, larder and coal store. The smaller of the bungalows had only two bedrooms and lacked a parlour.

Cost backlash
From nearly the moment they were built the ISSLT faced backlash for the enormity of the project and the agitation occupiers felt in relation to rent prices thus resulting in a rent strike. The dwellings were based on a sliding scale rent pricing, with the aim of the individual eventually owning their home ie: The cost of rent was based on the amount of income an individual made. However despite this, on average a dwelling cost around 1500 pounds. The strike saw a decrease in the rent prices, however further problems arose between the Trust and occupiers. In 1925, and investigation revealed that rents were higher than necessary to keep the organisation afloat. Rents successfully reduced again and with the reduction, it also prevented the Trust from building up a capital.

Infrastructure
The area over time became well established and very accessible boasting its own water supply tower and easy access to neighbouring towns as well as Dublin city. This was particularly evident with the opening of Killester Dart station in 1923. Killester also acquired  a “special” bus route for the area that was operated by “The Contemptible Omnibus Company”.

Amenities
Killester has a central shopping plaza on Howth Road, with a supermarket, a pub, Lynch's chipper, Chinese takeaway, florists, estate agents, hardware, pharmacy, doctor, dentist, florists, solicitors' offices, and other shops.  The local bank branch closed in October 2021 and is to be replaced with a Base Wood Fired Pizza franchise restaurant. There is also a service station. 

St. Anne's Park lies just beyond Killester on the Raheny / Clontarf side, and there are a number of small green spaces in the area.

Education
The primary schools in the area are St Brigid's national schools, both under Catholic patronage: on Howth Road for boys, and on St Brigid's Road for girls. Killester/Clontarf/Raheny Educate Together is located at St Peter's College. Some children also attend Greenlanes (Church of Ireland/multi-denominational) and Belgrove (Catholic) national schools in Clontarf. Local secondary schools include St Mary's in northern Killester and St Paul's College, Raheny, right on the border of the district. Many children from the area also attend secondary schools in neighbouring districts and some commute to schools in the city centre. Killester is also the site of a third-level institution, Killester College of Further Education, formerly known as St Peter's College.

Religion

Today there is a Roman Catholic Parish of Killester. The current Roman Catholic church, on Howth Road, opposite St. Brigid's National School, was constructed from 1924, and was consecrated in 1926. For many years, it was the parish church for the combined parish of Killester and Raheny. It was extended in 1952. Alongside the church is a parish resource centre, opened in the autumn of 2004, with multiple rooms and a coffee shop overlooking the church's peace garden. Notably, the church holds a reputed relic of St. Brigid, one of Ireland's three patron saints; a fragment of her cheekbone was brought from Portugal, where her skull is stored, in 1928. The church's reliquary was stolen in 2012 but the relic was not in it at the time. 

The old Parish of Killester in the Church of Ireland (the Parish of St. Brigid) was merged with Clontarf Parish in 1686 (the parish church is located on Seafield Road, Clontarf), and the combined entity still serves the Anglican communities of both areas. A new parish centre was built beside the parish church in the 2000s, to serve the needs of parishioners and, as capacity allows, the wider community of all faiths.

Sport
The local football (soccer) club is Killester Donnycarney F.C., who play in the Leinster Senior League. 
The local basketball club is Killester. The local rugby, cricket & hockey clubs are Clontarf. The local GAA club is Craobh Chiaráin CLG, based at Parnell Park.

Representation and governance
Killester lies within the Clontarf local electoral area, and the Dublin Bay North national constituency. Richard Bruton is the TD for the area.

Notable residents
Gabriel Byrne, actor
Brian Fenton, Gaelic footballer who bought a house in Killester
Paul Harrington, musician, Eurovision winner
Deirdre Heeney, FF Councillor and former Lord Mayor 
Cian Healy, rugby union player, including at international level
Marty Whelan, DJ and presenter, born in Killester

References

Further reading
 Garrett, Arthur; 2006 (new edition); Killester, Dublin: History of Killester Parish

External links
 The History of Killester Facebook page
 Map showing the area

Towns and villages in Dublin (city)
Civil parishes of the barony of Coolock
Planned communities in the Republic of Ireland